was a Japanese film and stage actress.

Life
A graduate from Takarazuka Music and Dance School and member of the Takarazuka Revue, Chikage Awashima entered the Shochiku film studios and made her film debut in 1950. She appeared in films of numerous prominent directors like Yasujirō Ozu, Mikio Naruse, Keisuke Kinoshita, Tadashi Imai and Heinosuke Gosho. She received twice the Blue Ribbon Award and twice the Mainichi Film Award for her performances.

Awashima retired from stage in 2009. She died on 16 February 2012, aged 87, from cancer.

Selected filmography

Film

Television

Honours
 1950: Blue Ribbon Award for Best Actress for Ten'ya wan'ya and Okusama ni goyojin
 1955: Blue Ribbon Award for Best Actress for Marital Relations
 1958: Mainichi Film Award for Best Actress for Summer Clouds and Hotarubi
 1988: Medal with Purple Ribbon
 1995: Order of the Precious Crown, 4th Class, Wisteria
 1997: Mainichi Film Awards Kinuyo Tanaka Award

References

External links

 

1924 births
2012 deaths
Japanese film actresses
20th-century Japanese actresses
21st-century Japanese actresses
Deaths from cancer in Japan
Actresses from Tokyo
Takarazuka Revue
Recipients of the Medal with Purple Ribbon